Meret Becker (born 15 January 1969) is a German actress and singer.

Life and career
Meret Becker was born in Bremen, the daughter of the actors Monika Hansen and Rolf Becker. She was raised in Berlin by her mother with her stepfather Otto Sander along with her brother  Ben Becker. She is the granddaughter of comedian Claire Schlichting and the niece of the acrobat and comedian Jonny Buchardt.

In 1996, she married Alexander Hacke, a member of the band Einstürzende Neubauten, who contributed songs to Becker's albums, including Noctambule. They separated in 2000 and divorced two years later. Becker was a guest musician on Einstürzende Neubauten's album Ende Neu, singing Stella Maris in a duet with Blixa Bargeld.

She played the character Ernal Eggstein in the 1997 German film Comedian Harmonists, as well as Katya, a prostitute, in Painted Angels. A year later, in 1998, she gave several performances along with Nina Hagen. The short but sold-out tour was titled "Wir heißen beide Anna" in which both Becker and Hagen sang several songs by Bertold Brecht, set to music by Paul Dessau and Kurt Weill. Becker appeared in Rosa von Praunheim's film The Einstein of Sex (1999).

Meret has since recorded two studio albums, Nachtmahr, which featured Robert Rutman playing his giant sheetmetal instruments on several tracks, and Fragiles. Just like the first album, both of them contain songs, poetry and short stories, played with unusual instruments and avant-garde arrangements. In 1993, she appeared as the female singer in the U2 video for "Stay (Faraway, So Close!)". In 2005, she was a supporting actress in the film Munich, directed by Steven Spielberg.

Solo discography 
 Noctambule (1996)
 Nachtmahr (1998)
 Fragiles (2001)
 Pipermint - Das Leben, möglicherweise OST (2005)
 Deins & Done (2014)

Collaborations
 1993-'95 (live album with Ars Vitalis) (1995)
 Interviewed by Clive James for the BBC special, Clive James's Postcard From Berlin (1995)
 Stella Maris (duet with Einstürzende Neubauten) (1996)
 Performed on Dorothy Carter's album Lonesome Dove (2000)

Selected filmography

 Put on Ice (1980), as Anna
 Werner – Beinhart! (1990), as Rumpelstilzchen
  (1991), as Leah
  (1992), as Hanna Hecht
  (1992), as Bride
 Little Sharks (1992), as Herta
 Geteilte Nacht (1993), as Katrin
  (1993)
 Music Video for Stay (Faraway, So Close!) by U2 (1993, Video short), as Band's Lead Singer
 The Innocent (1993), as Ulrike
 Fernes Land Pa-Isch (1994, released in 2000), as Bibi
 The Blue One (1994), as Isabelle Skrodt
  (1994), as Sunny Schaefer
 The Promise (1994), as Sophie
 Killer Condom (1996), as Phyllis Higgins
  (1997), as Zille Watussnik
  (1997, TV film), as Charlie
 Life is All You Get (1997), as Moni
 Comedian Harmonists (1997), as Erna Eggstein
 Painted Angels (1998), as Katya
 Hundert Jahre Brecht (1998), as Jenny
 Das Gelbe vom Ei (1999, TV film), as Fanny Freese
 Annaluise & Anton (1999), as Elli Gast
 The Volcano (1999), as Tilly von Kammer
 The Einstein of Sex (1999), as a worker
 Rote Glut (2000, TV film), as Judith Vegener
  (2000), as Lulu
 Planet Alex (2001), as Frau
 Heinrich der Säger (2001), as Teresa Grantke
 Null Uhr 12 (2001), as Kathrin
 Nogo (2002), as Maria
 Mutti – Der Film (2003), as Dr. Loch
 Poem – Ich setzte den Fuß in die Luft und sie trug (2003)
 Hamlet_X (2003), as Hamlet
  (2004, TV miniseries), as Lou Hofmann
  (2004), as Sanja
  (2005), as Jenny
 The Call of the Toad (2005), as Sophia
  (2005), as Maria Pinn
  (2005), as Sophie Paulsen
 Munich (2005), as Yvonne
  (2006), as Mathilda Berger
 My Führer – The Really Truest Truth about Adolf Hitler (2007), as Sekretärin
 Messy Christmas (2007), as Pauline
 Die Glücklichen (2008), as Helene
 Friedliche Zeiten (2008), as Musiklehrerin
 Record 12 (2009), as Alena
 Boxhagener Platz (2010), as Renate
 Gurbet – Fremde Heimat (2010), as Irina
  (2010), as Helena Seliger
 Kokowääh (2011), as Charlotte
 Fliegende Fische müssen ins Meer (2011), as Roberta Meiringer
  (2011, TV film), as Katja
 Sources of Life (2013), as Elisabeth Freytag
 Wetlands (2013), as Helen's mother
  (2013), as Harriet
 Lügen und andere Wahrheiten (2014), as Coco
 Mann im Spagat: Pace, Cowboy, Pace (2016), as Lenker Gaby
 A Change in the Weather (2017), as Kalle
 Wer hat eigentlich die Liebe erfunden? (2018), as Alex
 Liliane Susewind – Ein tierisches Abenteuer (2018), as Oberst Essig
 Ostwind: Aris Ankunft (2019), as Britta

Awards
 1995 Bavarian Film Awards, Best Actress for Das Versprechen
 1998 German Film Awards, Outstanding Individual Achievement: Supporting Actress in Comedian Harmonists
 2005 Max Ophüls Festival, Film Score Award for Pipermint - Das Leben, möglicherweise OST

References

External links

 Official website 
 
 

1969 births
Living people
Actors from Bremen
German film actresses
German television actresses
German voice actresses
German women singers
Musicians from Bremen
20th-century German actresses
21st-century German actresses